Sydney Guillaume (born 22 July 1982) is a Haitian-American composer of contemporary classical music and film music, conductor, clinician, singer and pianist based out of Portland, Oregon. He has composed music for a variety of chamber ensembles, but is known primarily for his choral compositions.

Biography
Sydney Guillaume, originally from Port-au-Prince, Haiti, came to the United States at the age of 11. He began his post-secondary education at the Frost School of Music, where he received his Bachelor of Music in Composition with an emphasis in Media Writing and Production. There he studied with the acclaimed conductor Jo-Michael Scheibe, composer Robert Gower, and pianist Rosalina Sackstein

Guillaume is an active member of the choral community as a composer, singer, and conductor. He conducted the Pennsylvania Music Educators Association (PMEA) District 12 Honor Choir in 2013. He continues to compose original works, and has written for choirs such as The University of Miami Frost Chorale, The Nathaniel Dett Chorale, Seraphic Fire, Illinois Wesleyan University Collegiate Choir, The Saint Louis Chamber Singers, The Miami Children's Chorus, Kokopelli Choir, and The Westminster Chorus. In addition to chamber music, Guillaume also composes music for film and has often collaborated with Loyola Productions, a Los Angeles-based media production company.

Choral works
•	Kalinda (SSAATTBB, 2002) *published with Walton Music

•	Pour Toi, Mère (SSAATTBB with piano accompaniment, 2003)

•	Anmwe (SSAATTBB a cappella with soprano solo, 2005)

•	Touched in Love (SATB with piano accompaniment, 2005) *published with Colla Voce Music

•	Men Nou (SSA with piano accompaniment, 2006)

•	St. Francis de Sales Mass (SATB with organ, 2006/2008)

•	Dominus Vobiscum (SATB a cappella, 2007) *published with Walton Music

•	Twa Tanbou (SATB a cappella, 2007) *published with Walton Music

•	Koudjay (SSA a cappella, 2007) *published with Walton Music

•	Mama Afrika (SSAATTBB and percussion, 2008) *published with Walton Music

•	Wipip!!! (SATB a cappella, 2008) *published with Santa Barbara Music Publishing

•	Lakay (SSA and orchestra, 2008)

•	Ego Sum (SSAATTBB a cappella, 2009) *published with Walton Music

•	Peyi Mwen (arranged for SA with flute and piano accompaniment, 2010)

•	Au-delà du Chagrin (SATBB a cappella 2010) *published with Walton Music

•	Diplomasi (SATB with divisi a cappella, 2010)

•	N’ap Debat (TTBB with drums, 2010)

•	Kinalaganach (SSATB with brass quartet and drum, 2010)

•	Fèt Chanpèt (SATB with drums, 2010)

•	Ayiti 1 – 2 – 3 (SATB and baritone solo, with percussion, 2011)

•	Plakatap (SSA with percussion, 2011)

•	La Providence (SSA a cappella, 2011)

•	Tap-Tap (SATB a cappella, 2011)

•	Te Deum (SATBB a cappella, 2011)

•	Le Dernier Voyage (SSAATTBB a cappella, 2012)

•	Chapo Pou Fanm (SSAA a cappella, 2011)

•	Akeem (SSA and orchestra, 2013)

•	Gagòt (TTBB a cappella, 2013)

•	Blogodop (SATB with drums, 2013)

•	Nou Se Limyè (SATB with piano accompaniment, 2014)

•	Yon Monn Nouvo (SA and SATB with piano and percussion, 2014)

•	Kanpe La (TTBB a cappella, 2016)

•	Tchaka (SATB with percussion, 2016)

•	Leve Kanpe (SATB with percussion, 2019)

References

External links
Sydney Guillaume website

1982 births
Living people
American male classical composers
American classical composers
21st-century classical composers
People from Port-au-Prince
University of Miami Frost School of Music alumni
Haitian emigrants to the United States
21st-century American composers
21st-century American male musicians